Svetislav Verkić (born 11 June 1981) is a Serbian handball player for Vojvodina and the Serbia national team.

Career
Verkić started out at Jugović and helped the club win the EHF Challenge Cup in the 2000–01 season. He later moved abroad and played in Portugal, Norway, Slovakia and Germany.

At international level, Verkić represented Serbia at the 2019 World Men's Handball Championship.

References

External links
 EHF record

1981 births
Living people
Sportspeople from Novi Sad
Serbian male handball players
RK Jugović players
RK Vojvodina players
RK Crvena zvezda players
MT Melsungen players
Handball-Bundesliga players